Beta Doradus, Latinized from β Doradus, is the second brightest star in the southern constellation of Dorado. It has a variable apparent visual magnitude, and is visible to the naked eye from the southern hemisphere.

Beta Doradus is a Cepheid variable that regularly changes magnitude from a low of 4.08 to a high of 3.46 over a period of  9.84318 days. The light curve of this magnitude change follows a nearly regular saw-tooth pattern, with average amplitude variations period to period about 0.005 magnitude from average amplitude of 0.62 magnitude. During each radial pulsation cycle, the radius of the star varies by ±3.9 times the Sun's radius around a mean of 67.8. Its spectral type and luminosity class are likewise variable, from F-type to G-type and from a supergiant to a bright giant.

Far ultraviolet emissions have been detected from this star with the Far Ultraviolet Spectroscopic Explorer, while X-ray emissions were detected with the XMM-Newton space telescope. The X-ray luminosity is about 1 × 1029 erg/s and the emission varies with the pulsation period, suggesting a connection with the pulsation process. The peak X-ray emissions are in the 0.6–0.8 keV energy range, which occurs for plasmas with temperatures of 7–10 million K.

References

F-type supergiants 
Classical Cepheid variables

Dorado (constellation)
Doradus, Beta
CD-62 00214
037350
026069
1922